CDC Queensland, formerly Buslink Queensland, is an Australian bus operator in the Gladstone, Rockhampton and Sunshine Coast regions of Queensland. It is a subsidiary of ComfortDelGro Australia.

History

In 1999, Northern Territory bus operator Buslink purchased Gladstone Bus & Coach and began operating bus services in Gladstone under the Buslink Queensland brand. The following year, in 2000, Buslink established school bus operations in Sunshine Coast, and in 2002, Buslink purchased Sunshine Coast school bus operations from Stagecoach. Stagecoach had previously bought the school bus operations from Sunbus in 1997.

In July 2008, Calliope Coaches was purchased and integrated into the Gladstone operation.

In November 2018, Buslink was purchased by ComfortDelGro Australia. On 1 October 2020, Buslink Queensland was rebranded CDC Queensland, with Sunshine Coast operations rebranded CDC Sunshine Coast and Gladstone operations rebranded CDC Gladstone. In July 2021, CDC Queensland agreed terms to purchase Young's Bus Service with 42 buses and depots in Rockhampton and Yeppoon that will expand the fleet to 197.

In March 2022, CDC Queensland entered into an agreement to purchase Rothery's Coaches in Rockhampton, adding a further fleet of 16 buses to the Rockhampton operation. The acquisition was finalised on 25 June 2022.

Fleet
As at May 2018, the fleet consisted of 158 buses. Fleet livery is white with blue stripes. On the Sunshine Coast, this is replaced by the TransLink livery of white body, green ends, a green and blue wavy stripe down each side and the TransLink logo toward the back.

Depots
Depots are operated in Caloundra, Coolum, Gladstone, Kunda Park, Noosaville, Rockhampton and Yeppoon.

References

External links
Company website

Bus companies of Queensland
ComfortDelGro companies
Translink (Queensland)
Transport companies established in 1997
1997 establishments in Australia